Cristina Carp (born 28 July 1997) is a Romanian footballer who plays as a forward for Como in the Serie A and has appeared for the Romania women's national team.

Career
Carp has been capped for the Romania national team, appearing for the team during the 2019 FIFA Women's World Cup qualifying cycle.

References

External links
 
 
 

1997 births
Living people
Romanian women's footballers
Fortuna Hjørring players
Romania women's international footballers
Women's association football forwards
FCU Olimpia Cluj players
U.C. Sampdoria (women) players
A.S.D. Pink Sport Time players
Expatriate women's footballers in Italy
Expatriate women's footballers in Denmark
Expatriate women's footballers in Switzerland
Romanian expatriate sportspeople in Italy
Romanian expatriate sportspeople in Denmark
Romanian expatriate sportspeople in Switzerland
Serie A (women's football) players
Elitedivisionen players
FF Lugano 1976 players
Swiss Women's Super League players